Tokugawa Ieharu (徳川家治) (June 20, 1737 – September 17, 1786) was the tenth shōgun of the Tokugawa shogunate of Japan, who held office from 1760 to 1786.

His childhood name was Takechiyo (竹千代).

Ieharu died in 1786 and given the Buddhist name Shunmyoin and buried at Kan'ei-ji.

Family
 Father: Tokugawa Ieshige
 Mother: Oko no Kata (d. 1728) later Shinshin'in
 Wife: Iso no Miya Tomoko (1738–1771)
 Concubines:
 Omiyo no Kata
 Ochiho no Kata (1737–1791) later Renkoin
 Oshina no Kata (d. 1778) later Yoren-in
 Child:
 Chiyohime (1756–1757) by Tomoko
 Manjuhime (1761–1773) (born by Tomoko but after she died adopted by Ieharu's concubine, Omaki no Kata)
 Tokugawa Takechiyo later Tokugawa Iemoto (1762–1779) born by Ochiho no Kata
 Tokugawa Teijiro (1762–1763) born by Oshina no Kata
 Adopted: 
 Tokugawa Ienari
 Tanehime (1765–1794), daughter of Tokugawa Munetake and married Tokugawa Harutomi of Kishū Domain

Events of the Ieharu's bakufu
 Tenmei gannen (天明元年) or Tenmei 1 (1781): The new era name of Tenmei (meaning "Dawn") was created to mark the enthronement of Emperor Kōkaku.  The previous era ended and the new one commenced in An'ei 11, on the 2nd day of the 4th month. According to Nihon Ōdai Ichiran, Ieharu was appointed Udaijin (Minister of the Right) of the Emperor's Kugyō, which was quite rare and considered a great favour. 
 Tenmei 2 (1782): Great Tenmei Famine begins.
 Tenmei 2 (1782): An analysis of silver currency in China and Japan "Sin sen sen pou (Sin tchuan phou)" was presented to the emperor by Kutsuki Masatsuna (1750–1802), also known as Kutsuki Oki-no kami Minamoto-no Masatsuna, hereditary daimyō of Oki and Ōmi with holdings in Tanba and Fukuchiyama -- related note at Tenmei 7 below.
 Tenmei 3 (1783): Mount Asama  (浅間山, Asama-yama) erupted in Shinano, one of the old provinces of Japan (Tenmei eruption).  Japanologist Isaac Titsingh's published account of the Asama-yama eruption was the first of its kind in the West (1820).  The  volcano's devastation makes the Great Tenmei Famine even worse.
 Tenmei 4 (1784): Country-wide celebrations in honor of Kūkai (also known as Kōbō-Daishi, founder of Shingon Buddhism) who died 950 years earlier.
 Tenmei 4 (1784): The son of the shōguns chief counselor was assassinated inside Edo Castle. The comparatively young wakadoshiyori, was the son of the senior wakadoshiyori Tanuma Tonomo-no-kami Okitsugu. The younger Tanuma was killed in front of his father as both were returning to their norimono after a meeting of the Counselors of State had broken up.  The involvement of senior figures in the bakufu was suspected; however, none but the lone assassin himself, Sano Masakoto, was punished.  The result was that Tanuma-initiated, liberalizing reforms within the bakufu and relaxation the strictures of sakoku were blocked.
 Tenmei 6, on the 8th day of the 9th month (September 17, 1786): Death of Tokugawa Ieharu.  He is buried in Edo.
 Tenmei 7 (1787): Kutsuki Masatsuna published Seiyō senpu (Notes on Western Coinage), with plates showing European and colonial currency – related note at Tenmei 2 above. – see online image of 2 adjacent pages from library collection of Kyoto University of Foreign Studies and Kyoto Junior College of Foreign Languages

Eras of Ieharu's bakufu
The years in which Ieharu was shōgun are more specifically identified by more than one era name or nengō.
 Hōreki  (1751–1764)
 Meiwa  (1764–1772)
 An'ei  (1772–1781)
 Tenmei  (1781–1789)

Ancestry

Notes

References
 Hall, John Whitney. (1955) Tanuma Okitsugu: Forerunner of Modern Japan. Cambridge: Harvard University Press.
 Screech, Timon. (2000). Shogun's Painted Culture: Fear and Creativity in the Japanese States, 1760–1829. London: Reaktion Books. 
 Screech, Timon. (2006). Secret Memoirs of the Shoguns:  Isaac Titsingh and Japan, 1779–1822. London: RoutledgeCurzon. 
 Titsingh, Isaac. (1822). Illustrations of Japan.  London: Ackerman.
 Titsingh, Isaac. (1834). [Siyun-sai Rin-siyo/Hayashi Gahō, 1652], Nipon o daï itsi ran; ou, [https://books.google.com/books?id=18oNAAAAIAAJ&dq=nipon+o+dai+itsi+ran  Annales des empereurs du Japon.]  Paris: Oriental Translation Fund of Great Britain and Ireland.
 Totman, Conrad. (1967). Politics in the Tokugawa bakufu, 1600–1843. Cambridge: Harvard University Press.

External links 

1737 births
1786 deaths
18th-century shōguns
Tokugawa shōguns
Tokugawa clan